Setberg is a "Kirkjustaður" located on the Snæfellsnes peninsula, in the Grundarfjörður municipality.

The Setberg Church is a small, towerless wooden church located in Setberg. The church was erected in 1892 by Sveinn Jónsson.
Although the current church was built in the 19th century, there has been a church in Setberg since the 12th century. 
Prior to the Icelandic Reformation the patronage of the Setberg Church was the holy cross.

Notable people
Steinn Jónsson (c. 1660-1739), Bishop who served in Setberg, printed the bible in Hólar for the third time in Iceland.
Björn Halldórsson (c. 1724–1794), Priest who served in Setberg, possibly first person to grow potatoes in Iceland.

References

Sources
"Setbergskirkja (1892)". kirkjukort.net (in Icelandic). Retrieved July 27, 2020.
"Kirkju- og Safnaðarstarf". grundarfjordur.is (in Icelandic). Retrieved July 27, 2020.

Farms in Iceland
Grundarfjörður
Populated places in Western Region (Iceland)